Collegeville is a city neighborhood in the  North Birmingham community of Birmingham, Alabama. It is the location of Bethel Baptist Church, a National Historic Landmark.

Neighborhoods in Birmingham, Alabama
Geography of Jefferson County, Alabama